Elizabeth Hirak Field is an academic scholar and professor in the University of Iowa’s Department of Internal Medicine.

Education
Field received her BS degree in physics (magna cum laude) from Millersville University of Pennsylvania. She received her MD degree from Penn State's Hershey Medical Center, where she also performed her residency in internal medicine. She conducted a five-year postdoctoral fellowship in both immunology and rheumatology at Stanford University School of Medicine, Stanford, California.

Career and research
Field has served as a professor in the Department of Internal Medicine, University of Iowa College of Medicine, Iowa City, Iowa, since 1986.  She also directs the VA Medical Center. Iowa Regional Histocompatibility and Immunogenetics Laboratory .

Field has conducted research  in transplantation immunology, immunologic tolerance and CD4+CD25+ regulatory cells and has a patent pending for:  CD4+CD25+ Inhibitory Hybridoma Clones. Field's research focuses on mechanisms of acquired immunologic tolerance by studying mouse models of neonatal tolerance and acquired tolerance in the adult.

In addition, she has written numerous articles for peer-reviewed publications and has a variety of ongoing research support work.

Awards and honors

 VA Career Development Award, Northern Illinois Chapter of the Lupus Foundation
 Outstanding Investigator of the Central Society for Clinical Research 
 Alumni Fellow Award, Penn State University College of Medicine
 2006 Millersville University of Pennsylvania commencement speaker
 Invited Speaker at the Keystone Symposium
 Invited Speaker at the 6th Basic Sciences Symposium of the Transplantation Society in Asilomar, CA.
 Invited Speaker at the 32nd Annual Immunology Conference in Chicago
 Northern California Chapter of the Arthritis Foundation Fellowship
 Pfizer Medical Research Merit Award
 ARA Senior Rheumatology Scholar Award
 Giannini Foundation Medical Research Fellow and Teaching Recognition for Introduction to Clinical Medicine.

References

Year of birth missing (living people)
Living people
Penn State Milton S. Hershey Medical Center
American rheumatologists
American immunologists
Millersville University of Pennsylvania alumni
Stanford University School of Medicine alumni
University of Iowa faculty